Michael Okyere Baafi is a Ghanaian politician and businessman who was appointed Executive Secretary of the Ghana Free Zones Board in 2017. and resigned in 2021 following his election as the Member of parliament for the New Juaben South (Ghana parliament constituency).

Work experience 
Okyere Baafi was the Head of Sales and Marketing at the Phoenix Insurance.

He holds MBA in Marketing and Corporate Strategy from the University of Ghana, and a Bachelor of Education (Honours) degree, University of Cape Coast.

He's a member of the Chartered Institute of Marketing, UK and has over 10 years experience in insurance marketing.

Politics 
He is a member of the  New Patriotic Party and is currently the Chairman of the Finance Committee of the National Youth Wing of the New Patriotic Party (NPP). He is also a member of the Trade and Industry sub-Committee of the Transition team and was the Vice Chairman of the New Juaben South constituency. He is currently the member of parliament for New Juaben South (Ghana parliament constituency) in the Eastern Region.

Executive Secretary at Ghana Free Zones Board 
Baafi's appointment took effect from Thursday, 26 January 2017. Assuming office as the GFZB secretary, he has made quiet remarkable contribution to society by supporting the construction of an ultra modern computer laboratory for the Wesley Methodist Basic School at Koforidua in the Eastern Region and promises  serve in the interest of local investors during his term of office.

Personal life 
Michael Okyere Baafi hails from Koforidua in the Eastern Region. He is married to Lawyer Mrs. Ewura Esi Okyere Baafi and they are blessed with a son.

References 

1976 births
Living people
People from Koforidua
New Patriotic Party politicians
University of Cape Coast alumni
University of Ghana alumni